Eu sunt Adam was a 1996 Romanian film directed by Dan Pița. It is based on Mircea Eliade's stories With the Gypsy Girls, The Old Man and the Bureaucrats and ''Two Generals' Uniforms.

References

External links

Eu sunt Adam at Cinemagia

1996 films
Films based on short fiction
Films based on works by Mircea Eliade
1990s Romanian-language films
Films directed by Dan Pița
Romanian fantasy films
1996 fantasy films